Gulf Energy Thermal Power Station, also Athi River Thermal Power Station, is a , heavy fuel oil-fired thermal power station in Kenya.

This power station is one of about a dozen heavy fuel-fired power stations which offer the country backup capacity as standby plants that come on-line quickly, if and when geothermal and weather-dependent hydro-power fail to provide adequate supply to the national grid.

Location

The coordinates of the power station are: 1°27'30.0"S, 37°00'14.0"E (Latitude:-1.458333; Longitude:37.003889).

Overview
The power station is owned and operated by Gulf Power Limited (GPL), a special purpose vehicle company created to own and operate the business. GPL is in turn owned by a consortium of independent power developers, including Gulf Energy Limited and Noora Power Limited, two companies incorporated in Kenya. In January 2019 Britam Holdings Limited, through its subsidiary, Britam Asset Managers Kenya Limited, acquired a stake in Gulf Energy Limited for a KSh1.4 billion (US$13.9 million) consideration.

The power generated by this power station is sold to Kenya Power and Lighting Company, under a 20-year power purchase agreement, which expires in December 2034.

Financing
This power station received funding from several international financiers including as illustrated in the table below:

See also

Kenya Power Stations
Africa Power Stations
World Power Stations

References

External links
Thermal power generators increase five-month output

Machakos County
Oil-fired power stations in Kenya
Energy infrastructure completed in 2014
2014 establishments in Kenya